Middlesex is a coastal unincorporated community on the Eastern Shore of Virginia.

In popular culture
It is the name of the main city in the film Donnie Darko, which was shot entirely in California.

References

Unincorporated communities in Virginia
Unincorporated communities in Accomack County, Virginia